Twig borer refers to a number of species of beetles and moths that chew holes into small branches of trees and shrubs.  Many of these insects are agricultural pests.  Animals that are called twig borers include:

Beetles

beetle in the family Bostrichidae
Amphicerus bicaudatus (apple twig borer or grape cane borer), beetle in the family Bostrichidae
Amphicerus bimaculatus (Grape cane borer beetle), beetle in the family Bostrichidae
Melalgus confertus (branch and twig borer), beetle in the family Bostrichidae

beetle in the family Curculionidae
Xylosandrus compactus (black twig borer or coffee twig borer), beetle in the family Curculionidae

beetle in the family Cerambycidae

Chlorophorus varius (grape wood borer)
Bacchisa fortunei (blue pear twig borer), beetles in the family Cerambycidae
Oberea tripunctata (dogwood twig borer), beetle in the family Cerambycidae
Oberea delongi (poplar twig borer), beetle in the family Cerambycidae
Xylotrechus pyrrhoderus (grape twig borer), beetle in the family Cerambycidae

Moths

moth in the family Gelechiidae
Coleotechnites bacchariella (coyote brush twig borer moth), moth in the family Gelechiidae
Anarsia lineatella (peach twig borer), moth in the family Gelechiidae

moth in the family Crambidae
Terastia meticulosalis (erythrina twigborer), moth in the family Crambidae

moth in the family Tortricidae
Gypsonoma haimbachiana (cottonwood twig borer), moth in the family Tortricidae
Hystrichophora taleana (indigobush twig borer), moth in the family Tortricidae
Ecdytolopha insiticiana (locust twig borer), moth in the family Tortricidae

Proteoteras
Proteoteras willingana (eastern boxelder twig borer moth), moth in the family Tortricidae
Proteoteras aesculana (maple twig borer), moth in the family Tortricidae
Proteoteras crescentana (northern boxelder twig borer moth), moth in the family Tortricidae
Proteoteras arizonae (western boxelder twig borer moth), moth in the family Tortricidae

Insect common names